Altamaha may refer to:

Altamaha chiefdom, a Native American chiefdom, part of the paramount chiefdom known as Ocute and later La Tama
Altamaha, Georgia, an unincorporated community
Altamaha River, in the U.S. state of Georgia
Altamaha Technical College, a technical college in Jessup, Georgia
Lake Altamaha, in Florida
, any of several US Navy ships